Dominique Bagouet (9 July 1951 - 9 December 1992) was a French choreographer and dancer. He was a great figure in contemporary dance and new French dance.

Biography
Dominique Bagouet began training in classical dance in Cannes, in the school of Rosella Hightower, and obtained his first engagements at the Ballet du Grand Théâtre de Genève directed by Alfonso Cata, where he danced the Balanchine repertoire. 

In 1974, he left for the United States where he acquired the techniques of Martha Graham and José Limón before tackling postmodern dance with Merce Cunningham, Trisha Brown and Lar Lubovitch, among others.

The story of a posthumous performance of his play Jours étranges opens the tribute play Les Idoles by Christophe Honoré.

Dominique Bagouet is buried in the Bardines cemetery in Angoulême.

External links
 Obituary at The Independent.co.uk

1951 births
1992 deaths
Contemporary dancers
French choreographers
French male dancers
People from Angoulême
AIDS-related deaths in France